Nicole Brändli (born 18 June 1979) is a professional cyclist from Switzerland. She is a three-time winner of Giro d'Italia Femminile. She was the Swiss National Road Race champion in 2001, 2002 and 2003. She also competed at the 2000 Summer Olympics, 2004 Summer Olympics and the 2008 Summer Olympics.

Palmarès

1996 
2nd Time Trial, National Junior Road Championships

1997 
1st Berner Rundfahrt
2nd Time Trial, UCI Junior Road World Championships

1998 
3rd Berner Rundfahrt

1999 
UEC European Road Championships
2nd U23 Time Trial
3rd U23 Road Race
2nd Road Race, National Road Championships
3rd Rund Um die Rigi–Gersau
10th Road Race, UCI Road World Championships
10th Trofeo Alfredo Binda

2000 
1st Time Trial, National Road Championships
2nd Overall Eko Tour Dookola Polski
2nd Berner Rundfahrt
3rd U23 Time Trial, UEC European Road Championships
3rd Giro del Lago Maggiore
9th La Flèche Wallonne

2001 
National Road Championships
1st Road Race
3rd Time Trial
1st Overall Giro d'Italia Femminile
1st Stages 10 & 11
1st Overall Giro della Toscana Int. Femminile
1st Trofeo Alfredo Binda
UEC European Road Championships
1st U23 Time Trial
3rd U23 Road Race
UCI Road World Championships
2nd Time Trial
6th Road Race
2nd Overall Gracia–Orlová
3rd Berner Rundfahrt

2002 
National Road Championships
1st Road Race
2nd Time Trial
1st Overall Vuelta Castilla y Leon
1st Stage 9 Grande Boucle Féminine Internationale
2nd Overall Giro del Trentino Alto Adige-Südtirol
UCI Road World Championships
2nd Time Trial
2nd Road Race
3rd Overall Giro della Toscana Int. Femminile
9th Trofeo Alfredo Binda

2003 
1st Road Race, National Road Championships
1st Overall Giro d'Italia Femminile
1st Stage 3
1st Overall Gracia–Orlová
2nd Berner Rundfahrt
6th La Flèche Wallonne

2004 
1st Overall Gracia–Orlová
1st GP Carnevale d'Europa
3rd Time Trial, National Road Championships
6th Road Race, UCI Road World Championships
8th La Flèche Wallonne

2005 
1st Overall Giro d'Italia Femminile
1st Prologue, Stages 1 & 7
1st Overall Albstadt Frauen Etappenrennen
1st Stage 2
1st Bern–Oberbottigen
2nd Overall Giro del Trentino Alto Adige-Südtirol
2nd Road Race, National Road Championships
2nd Trofeo Citta' di Rosignano
3rd Souvenir Magali Pache
7th La Flèche Wallonne

2006 
1st GP Ouest France
1st Stage 3 Giro della Toscana Int. Femminile
2nd Overall Giro d'Italia Femminile
1st Stage 1 
2nd Overall Giro del Trentino Alto Adige-Südtirol
2nd Road Race, National Road Championships
3rd Overall Emakumeen Euskal Bira
3rd Overall Gracia–Orlová
3rd Giro del Lago Maggiore
8th Road Race, UCI Road World Championships
8th La Flèche Wallonne

2007 
2nd Overall Giro d'Italia Femminile
1st Stage 5
2nd Overall Trophée d'Or Féminin
1st Stage 2
3rd Overall Emakumeen Euskal Bira
3rd Overall Albstadt Frauen Etappenrennen
3rd Road Race, National Road Championships
6th La Flèche Wallonne

2008 
1st Leo Wirth Strassenrennen
1st Giro del Lago Maggiore
7th La Flèche Wallonne

2009 
1st GP Raiffeisen
3rd Overall Giro d'Italia Femminile
3rd Chambéry
6th Overall Giro della Toscana Int. Femminile
8th Overall Thüringen-Rundfahrt der Frauen
1st Stage 1 (TTT)
8th Road Race, UCI Road World Championships

2016 
3rd Overall Tour of Zhoushan Island I

References

External links
Nicole Brändli page

Swiss female cyclists
1979 births
Living people
Cyclists at the 2000 Summer Olympics
Cyclists at the 2004 Summer Olympics
Cyclists at the 2008 Summer Olympics
Olympic cyclists of Switzerland
Cyclists from Zürich
21st-century Swiss women